Charles Spaak (25 May 1903 – 4 March 1975) was a Belgian screenwriter who was noted particularly for his work in the French cinema during the 1930s. He was the son of the dramatist and poet Paul Spaak, the brother of the politician Paul-Henri Spaak, and the father of the actresses Catherine Spaak and Agnès Spaak.

Career
Charles Spaak was born in Brussels in 1903 into a prominent Belgian family.  In 1928 he moved to Paris and took a post as secretary to the film-maker Jacques Feyder, who then asked him to work on the adaptation of a stage play for his film Les Nouveaux Messieurs. He also worked as head of publicity for the production company Albatros.  He went on to write the screenplays for Feyder's most important films of the 1930s: Le Grand Jeu, Pension Mimosas, and La Kermesse héroïque.  Spaak was also in demand to work with other leading directors. During the 1930s he worked with Julien Duvivier on La Bandera (1935) and La Belle Équipe (1936), and with Jean Grémillon on La Petite Lise (1930) and Gueule d'amour (1937).  He also collaborated with Jean Renoir on two of his major films, Les Bas Fonds (1936) and La Grande Illusion (1937).

Many of these films of the 1930s are marked by a concern for realistic detail with sharply written dialogue, often pessimistic in tone, and several of them provided leading roles which were played by Jean Gabin.  He established himself, alongside Jacques Prévert and Henri Jeanson, as a leading screenwriter during one of the French cinema's richest periods.

During the German occupation of France, Spaak chose to return to Paris and found work on a number of the wartime productions that were made there, including further films with Duvivier and Grémillon. (In Bertrand Tavernier's film Laissez-passer (2001) which gives a detailed picture of how film-making continued in occupied Paris, Spaak is portrayed in 1943 when he was working on a film for the Continental Films production company while in prison.)

After the war Spaak worked with new directors and in a wider range styles, and he formed a particular association with André Cayatte in a series of films set against a background of the French judicial system: Justice est faite (1950), Nous sommes tous les assassins (1951), Avant le deluge (1953), and Le Dossier noir (1955). He also undertook some of the literary adaptations which marked the 'quality cinema' of the 1950s, including Thérèse Raquin (1953) and Crime et Châtiment (1956).

In 1949 Spaak made his only venture into directing with Le Mystère Barton, but the film met with little success.

Charles Spaak continued working selectively on scenarios until the early 1970s, and he died in 1975 in Vence in the South of France.

Selective list of screenplays
Charles Spaak wrote or contributed to more than 100 film screenplays, including the following:

 1929  Les Nouveaux Messieurs  (d. Jacques Feyder) 
 1930  La Petite Lise (Little Lise, d. Jean Grémillon)
 1931  Dainah la métisse (d. Jean Grémillon)
 1933  Le Grand Jeu (d. Jacques Feyder)
 1934  Pension Mimosas (d. Jacques Feyder)
 1935  La Bandera (d. Julien Duvivier)
 1935  Les Beaux Jours  (d. Marc Allégret)
 1935  La Kermesse héroïque (d. Jacques Feyder)
 1935  Veille d'armes (d. Marcel L'Herbier)
 1936  Les Bas-fonds (d. Jean Renoir)
 1936  La Belle Équipe (d. Julien Duvivier)
 1936  L'Homme du jour (The Man of the Hour) (d. Julien Duvivier)
 1936  Les Loups entre eux (d. Léon Mathot)
 1936  La Porte du large (d. Marcel L'Herbier)
 1937  Aloha, le chant des îles (d. Léon Mathot)
 1937  L'Étrange Monsieur Victor (The Strange Monsieur Victor) (d. Jean Grémillon)
 1937  La Grande Illusion (d. Jean Renoir)
 1937  Gueule d'amour (d. Jean Grémillon)
 1938  La Fin du jour (The End of the Day) (d. Julien Duvivier)
 1938  Le Récif de corail (Coral Reefs) (d. Maurice Gleize)
 1939  Le Dernier Tournant (d. Pierre Chenal)
 1939  Remorques (d. Jean Grémillon) [uncredited]
 1940  Untel père et fils (d. Julien Duvivier)
 1941  L'Assassinat du père Noël (Who Killed Santa Claus) (d. Christian-Jaque)
 1941  Péchés de jeunesse (d. Maurice Tourneur)
 1942  Le Lit à colonnes (d. Roland Tual)
 1943  Le ciel est à vous (The Woman Who Dared) (d. Jean Grémillon)
 1944  Les Caves du Majestic (Majestic Hotel Cellars) (d. Richard Pottier)
 1946  L'Affaire du collier de la reine (The Queen's Necklace) (d. Marcel L'Herbier)
 1946  Panique (Panic) (d. Julien Duvivier)
 1948  Éternel conflit (Eternal Conflict) (d. Georges Lampin)
 1949  Le Mystère Barton (The Barton Mystery) (d. Charles Spaak)
 1950  Black Jack (d. Julien Duvivier)
 1950  Justice est faite (d. André Cayatte)
 1952  Adorables créatures (d. Christian-Jaque)
 1952  Le Banquet des fraudeurs (d. Henri Storck)
 1952  Nous sommes tous des assassins (d. André Cayatte)
 1953  Avant le déluge (d. André Cayatte)
 1953  Thérèse Raquin (d. Marcel Carné)
 1955  Le Dossier noir (d. André Cayatte)
 1955  Scuola elementare (d. Alberto Lattuada)
 1956  Crime et Châtiment (Crime and Punishment) (d. Georges Lampin)
 1956  Paris, Palace Hotel (d. Henri Verneuil)
 1957  Charmants Garçons (Charming Boys) (d. Henri Decoin)
 1957  Quand la femme s'en mêle (Send a Woman When the Devil Fails) (d. Yves Allégret)
 1961  Cartouche (d. Philippe de Broca)
 1961  La Chambre ardente (d. Julien Duvivier)
 1962  Germinal (d. Yves Allégret)
 1962  Le Glaive et la Balance  (d.André Cayatte)
 1963  Mathias Sandorf (d. Georges Lampin)
 1973   (d. Étienne Périer)

Further reading
Spaak, Janine. Charles Spaak, mon mari. (Paris: Éditions France-Empire, [1977]).

References

External links
 Charles Spaak at Ciné-Ressources [in French].
 Charles Spaak commemorated at the Université Européenne d'Écriture [in French].
 Charles Spaak at IMDb.

Red Orchestra (espionage)
Belgian screenwriters
1903 births
1975 deaths
20th-century screenwriters